The Bangui Basketball League (in French: Ligue de Basketball de Bangui) is a semi-professional basketball league in Bangui, Central African Republic. It is the highest level basketball league in the country, as the national federation organises no national league.

Teams

ABC
Abeilles 
AS Tongolo 
ASOPT
Bantou
BEAC
BEAfrica
Harlem
Hit Trésor
Mazanga
Plateau
Red Star
Tondema
Toukia

Champions 

 2003: Tondema
 2006: AS Mazanga
 2013: Tondema
 2015: New Tech Bantou
 2017: Abeilles
 2019: Abeilles
 2021: Tondema
 2022: Bangui Sporting Club

Finals

MVP Award

References

External links
AfroBasket.com League Page

Basketball competitions in the Central African Republic
Basketball leagues in Africa